Lonicera similis is a species of flowering plant in the family Caprifoliaceae, native to Western China. This honeysuckle is known in cultivation by the variety delavayi (the Delavay honeysuckle) which is reported by some authorities to be synonymous with L. similis itself. The flowers are followed by black berries. The Latin specific epithet similis means “similar to”. It is similar in appearance to L. japonica, but larger and more robust. The name delavayi honours the French missionary and botanist Père Jean Marie Delavay (1834-1895).

It has gained the Royal Horticultural Society’s Award of Garden Merit.

References

Flora of China
similis